Alchevsky is a surname and may refer to:
 Hryhory Alchevsky (Григорій Олексійович Алчевський; 1866–1920), Ukrainian composer
 Oleksiy Alchevsky (Алчевський Олексій Кирилович; 1835–1901), Ukrainian entrepreneur, philanthropist, and industrialist